was a town located in Shioya District, Tochigi, Japan.

As of 2003, the town had an estimated population of 29,898 and a density of 598.08 persons per km². The total area was 49.99 km².

On March 28, 2005, Ujiie, along with the town Kitsuregawa (also from Shioya District), was merged to create the city of Sakura.

External links
 Sakura official website 

Dissolved municipalities of Tochigi Prefecture